Rogers & Wells was an international law firm founded in New York City in 1873.  After several name changes, it was renamed for William P. Rogers and John A. Wells. Firms that merged with it include Dwight, Harris, Koegel & Caskey of New York.

Background
The firm was well known for its litigation arm (second-largest in New York City after white shoe establishment firm Simpson Thacher & Bartlett). It also had an active capital markets and international finance practice, where its main client was Merrill Lynch. The firm at its peak embraced approximately 400 attorneys and maintained offices in New York, Washington, D.C., Los Angeles, Paris, London, Hong Kong, and Frankfurt. 

In 2000, the firm merged with London-based Clifford Chance. The firm practiced as Clifford Chance Rogers & Wells in the Americas until 2003, when the use of the legacy U.S. firm's name was discontinued. Just before and immediately after the merger, some high-profile partners decamped for other firms including New York rival Kaye Scholer. The Paris outpost joined Kramer Levin.

Notable alumni
William J. Casey, Director of Central Intelligence, 1981-1987
Kenneth Chenault, CEO of American Express
Roberta Karmel (born 1937), Centennial Professor of Law at Brooklyn Law School, and first female Commissioner of the U.S. Securities and Exchange Commission.
William P. Rogers, US Secretary of State, 1969–1973
Kenneth C. Royall, US Secretary of the Army, 1947–1949
Albert II, Prince of Monaco.

References

External links
Rogers & Wells Settles Suit
2 Law Firms Plan to Bridge The Atlantic
Rogers & Wells to Merge With London Law Firm

1873 establishments in New York (state)
2000 disestablishments in New York (state)
Defunct companies based in New York City
Defunct law firms of the United States
Law firms based in New York City
Law firms established in 1873
Law firms disestablished in 2000